Life Force is an outdoor abstract, bronze sculpture by David Bakalar, installed on the Columbia University campus in New York City, in 1992.

References

External links
 

1992 establishments in New York City
1992 sculptures
Abstract sculptures in New York City
Bronze sculptures in Manhattan
Columbia University campus
Outdoor sculptures in Manhattan